John Paisley (born 1938) is a Scottish actor working in China.

Early life and acting career
Paisley was born in Scotland in 1938. He graduated from Edinburgh College of Speech and Drama, followed by the Royal Scottish Academy of Music and Drama in 1959. He initially worked as an actor and stage manager as part of a repertory in England. He emigrated to Australia in 1961, working as an actor, teacher, writer, and playwright. He relocated to China to lecture at the Beijing University Department of Foreign Languages from 1999 to 2005, before returning to film work in Chinese productions. He married the painter Zheng Keying, his third wife, in 2005.

His most significant recent role was as John Rabe in the 2009 movie City of Life and Death.

Filmography

Film

Television

Screenplays

References

External links

20th-century Scottish male actors
21st-century Scottish male actors
1938 births
Living people
Alumni of Queen Margaret University
Scottish male film actors
Scottish male television actors